The Doge of Genoa ("Commander of the Genoese and Defender of the People") was the head of state of the Republic of Genoa, a city-state and soon afterwards a maritime republic, from 1339 until the state's extinction in 1797. Originally elected for life, after 1528 the Doges were elected for terms of two years. 

The Republic (or Dogate) was ruled by a small group of merchant families, from whom the doges were selected.

Form of address

The Genoese doge's form of address initially was "eccelso" (exalted), then "illustrissimo" (most illustrious), "eccellentissimo" (most excellent), and finally, "serenissimo principe" (most serene prince), "signore" (lord), or "altezza serenissima" (most serene highness).

History 

The first Doge of Genoa, Simone Boccanegra (Ligurian: Scimón Boccanéigra), whose name is kept alive by Verdi's opera, was appointed by public acclaim in 1339. Initially the Doge of Genoa was elected without restriction and by popular suffrage, holding office for life in the so-called "perpetual dogate"; but after the reform effected by Andrea Doria in 1528 the term of his office was reduced to two years. At the same time plebeians were declared ineligible, and the appointment of the doge was entrusted to the members of the great council, the Gran Consiglio, who employed for this purpose a complex political system.

The Palazzo Pubblico, where the Doges had formerly presided, was expanded in 1388 to accommodate the new ruler and style of government, the first of a series of radical reconstructions. It was renamed Palazzo Ducale and magnificently rebuilt in the 16th century. Until recently the palazzo housed courts, but it now functions as Genoa's cultural centre.

Of all the "perpetual" doges of Genoa who ruled for their lifetime, only one ruled for more than eight years. Many resigned or were driven out before taking office. Some failed to complete a single day in power. Between 1339 and 1528, only four Doges were legally elected. Genoa did not trust its Doges; the ruling caste of Genoa tied them to executive committees, kept them on a small budget, and kept them apart from the communal revenues held at the "Casa di San Giorgio".

Still, the position of Doge stood at the head of state patronage, and the city's inner group of leading merchant families vied with each other to place their man in the position. Rival elections were known to take place within the building. In 1389, a frustrated candidate made a surprise return from enforced exile accompanied by 7,000 supporters, and after dining amicably with the incumbent, politely but firmly ejected him, thanking him for serving so ably as his deputy during his own "unavoidable absence" from Genoa.

For generations two powerful families in Genoa all but monopolized the dogate: the Adorno and the Fregoso or di Campofregoso. Tomaso di Campofregoso became Doge three times: in 1415, 1421 and 1437. In 1461, Paolo Fregoso, archbishop of Genoa, enticed the current doge to his own palace, held him hostage and offered him the choice of retiring from the post or being hanged. When Fregoso was in due course himself toppled, he fled to the harbour, commandeered four galleys and launched himself on a whole new career as a pirate. Among other influential families in the republic were the Spinola, the Grimaldi, the Doria and the Durazzo, all these dynasties gave numerous doges to Genoa. While the doge's palace in Venice accumulated great furnishings and works of art over the years, in Genoa, each Doge was expected to arrive with his own furnishings and, when he left, to strip the palace to its bare walls.

In the 16th century, the republic enjoyed a dramatic revival under the leadership of the admiral, statesman and patron of the arts Andrea Doria who ruled the state as a virtual dictator but never actually became doge. It was through the Spanish empire in the New World that Genoa became rich again. And the bankers of Genoa handled Spain's financial business, which vastly enriched Genoa's banking oligarchy.

The Napoleonic Wars put an end to the office of Doge of Genoa. In 1797, when Napoleon Bonaparte incorporated Genoa into the newly organized Ligurian Republic, French soldiers and the city's mob ransacked the Doge's palace.

Election 
The Doge's election took place through the vote of the members of the Great Council and Minor Council of Genoa that met in a room with the same name at the Doge's Palace. The voting took place by drawing fifty golden balls which were contained in an urn placed in front of the throne. Thanks to a series of successive votes, the number of candidates was reduced to six and, among the latter, the one who obtained the highest number of votes was elected Doge.

List of Doges of Genoa

Lifetime office-holders

Simone Boccanegra, 1339–1344 (first reign)
Giovanni I di Murta, 1344–1350
Giovanni II Valente, 1350–1353
1353–1356 – Dogeship vacant.
Simone Boccanegra, 1356–1363, (second reign)
Gabriele Adorno, 1363–1370
Domenico di Campofregoso, 1370–1378
Antoniotto I Adorno, 17 June 1378 (first reign)
Nicolò Guarco (or Guasco), 1378–1383
Antoniotto I Adorno (second reign)
Federico di Pagana, 7 April 1383
Leonardo Montaldo, 1383–14 June 1385
Antoniotto I Adorno, 15 June 1385 – 1390 (third reign)
Giacomo Fregoso, 1390–1391
Antoniotto I Adorno, 1391–1392 (fourth reign)
Antoniotto Montaldo, 16 June 1392 – 1393 (first reign)
Pietro Fregoso, 13 July 1393
Clemente Promontorio, 13 July 1393
Francesco Giustiniano di Garibaldo, 14 July 1393 – October 1393
Antoniotto Montaldo, 1 November 1393 – May 1394 (second reign)
Niccolo Zoagli, 24 May 1394 – September 1394
Antonio Guarco, 17 September 1394 – 1 October 1394
Antoniotto I Adorno, 1394–1396, 5th term
1396–1413 – Dogeship vacant. Genoa held by the French.
Giorgio Adorno, 1413–1415
Barnaba Guano, 29 March 1415 – 3 July 1415
Tomaso di Campofregoso, 1415–1421 (first reign)
1421–1436 – Dogeship vacant. Genoa controlled by Milan.
Isnardo Guarco, serves as doge for one week in 1436
Tomaso di Campofregoso, 1436–1437 (second reign)
Battista Fregoso served as doge for a few hours
Tomaso di Campofregoso, 1437–1442 (third reign)
Raffaele Adorno, 28 Jan 1443 – 4 Jan 1447
Barnaba Adorno, 4 Jan 1447 – 30 Jan 1447
Giano I di Campofregoso, 30 Jan 1447 – Dec 1448
Lodovico di Campofregoso, 1448–1450 (first reign)
Pietro di Campofregoso, 1450–1458
1458–1461 – Dogeship vacant. Genoa occupied by France.
Prospero Adorno, 12 March 1461 – 8 July 1461
Spinetta Fregoso, 8 July 1461 – 11 July 1461
Lodovico di Campofregoso, July 1461 – March 1462 (second reign)
Paolo Fregoso, March 1462, served simultaneously as Archbishop of Genoa.
Lodovico di Campofregoso, 8 June 1462 (third reign)
Paolo Fregoso, 9 June 1462 – late 1463 (second reign)
Genoa accepts the rule of Francesco Sforza, no doge, 1463–1477
Prospero Adorno, 17 Aug 1477 – 25 Nov 1477 (second reign)
Battista Fregoso, 26 November 1478 – 25 November 1483
Paolo Fregoso, 1483–1488 (third reign)
1488–1499 – Dogeship vacant. Genoa ruled by Sforza.
1499–1507 – Dogeship vacant. Genoa occupied by France.
Paolo da Novi, 10 April 1507 – late 1507
1507–1511 – Dogeship vacant. Genoa occupied by France.
Giano II di Campofregoso, 1512–1513
Ottaviano Fregoso, 1513–1515
1515–1522 – Dogeship vacant. Genoa occupied by France.
Antoniotto II Adorno, 1522–1527
1527–1528 – Dogeship vacant. Genoa ruled by France.

Doges elected for two years

From 1528 to 1599

From 1599 to 1650

From 1650 to 1699

From 1699 to 1750

From 1750 to 1797

A complete list is at Italian Wikipedia: Elenco dei Dogi della Repubblica di Genova.

Notes

External links
Complete list of Genoese Doges at the "Regnal Chronologies" website
History of the Ligurian Republic, 1797 – 1805

 
Government of the Republic of Genoa
Genoa